Scarecrow is a 2020 Russian drama film directed by Dmitry Davydov. Laureate of the main prize of the 31st Kinotavr Film Festival. It is scheduled to be theatrically released on February 25, 2021 by Pro:vzglyad.

Plot 
The film tells about a healer and a hermit woman, whom people are afraid of, but despite this, they turn to her for help.

Cast

References

External links 
 

2020 films
Russian drama films
Yakut-language films